Elliptio downiei is a species of freshwater mussel, an aquatic bivalve mollusk in the family Unionidae, the river mussels.

This species is endemic to the United States.

References

Molluscs of the United States
downiei
Bivalves described in 1858
Taxonomy articles created by Polbot